Jeppesen is an American company and a subsidiary of Boeing.

Jeppesen may also refer to:

 Jeppesen (surname), includes a list of people with the name
 Jeppesen Victor Martin (1930–1993), Danish artist
 Jeppesen Gymnasium, former sports facility in Houston, Texas
 Jeppesen Stadium, former name of Robertson Stadium in Houston, Texas